The 2004 St Albans City and District Council election took place on 10 June 2004 to elect members of St Albans District Council in Hertfordshire, England. One third of the council was up for election and the council stayed under no overall control.

After the election, the composition of the council was:
Liberal Democrats 29
Conservative 17
Labour 11
Independent 1

Background
After the last election in 2003 the Liberal Democrats were the largest party on the council with 23 seats, compared to 21 for the Conservatives, 13 for Labour and there was 1 independent. In April 2004 the Liberal Democrats gained a seat from the Conservatives at a by-election in Verulam, which meant they needed to gain 6 seats at the 2004 council election to take a majority on the council. St Albans was reported by national newspapers to be a council that the Liberal Democrats were hoping to win a majority on.

18 seats were contested at the election with only Colney Heath and Sandridge wards not having elections. Candidates from the 3 main parties stood in all 18 wards apart from in Redbourn, where the Liberal Democrats did not put up a candidate to oppose the independent councillor, Tony Swendell, who was standing for re-election. Two other parties put up some candidates, 3 from the new St Albans Party and 2 from the Green Party.

4 Conservative councillors stood down at the election, Mike Bretherton, Mike Jameson, Martin Treasure and Hazel Ward, as well as 1 from Labour, Andrew Rose and 1 Liberal Democrat, John White.

Election result
The results saw the Liberal Democrat make 5 gains but come up one seat short of gaining an overall majority. They gained seats in Ashley and St Peters wards from Labour, and in Marshalswick South, Park Street and Wheathampstead from the Conservatives, to have exactly half of the 58 seats on the council. This reduced the Conservatives to 17 seats and Labour to 11 seats, while independent Anthony Swendell was re-elected in Redbourn.

Following the election the Liberal Democrats took control of the council with all of the seats on the council cabinet after winning a vote 29 to 24, with 1 abstention, despite opposition from both Labour and the Conservatives.

Ward results

References

2004
2004 English local elections
2000s in Hertfordshire